Highland Park Independent School District is a public school district based in Amarillo, Texas (USA).  It has two schools (an elementary school and a high school) operating on the same campus, and serves roughly 1,000 students.

The district covers all of eastern Potter County, including those portions of Amarillo generally east of Whitaker Road (this includes all of the land surrounding Rick Husband Amarillo International Airport and the east campus of Amarillo College including a former military housing community called Highland Park Village from which the district got its name). The district operated as a K-9 school for several years, but did not become an independent district until 1979 and did not expand to K-12 until the 1985-1986 school year.

In 2009, the school district was rated "recognized" by the Texas Education Agency.

References

External links

HP Graduating Class Portal

School districts in Potter County, Texas
School districts in Amarillo, Texas
School districts established in 1979
1979 establishments in Texas